Barvi Dam is an earthfill dam on the Barvi River near Badlapur, Thane district, in the state of Maharashtra in India.

Specifications

Purpose
 Water supply to Badlapur...
 CHIKHLOLI DAM...

References

One Day Picnic Spot Near Badlapur  the islands formed part of the KONDESHWAR, In the middle of divine nature, ‘Kondeshwar’ is a holy location with Lord Shiva Temple. It must be at the top of everyone's bucket list because it is surrounded by mountains and waterfalls. It is a popular tourist destination because it is located in Badlapur and is well connected to Mumbai and other adjacent towns.

Experience in the midst of nature with your family and friends. The dam is within 20 minutes’ drive from the city centre. It is surrounded by small hilltops and boasts views of the Tahuli Peaks in the distance.
There is a temple on the other side of the front door that provides a wider perspective of the dam. The location becomes more lively and lovely during the monsoon season. Muddy roads, wonderful rains, and freezing temperatures make it an ideal location for experiencing nature. When the dam overflows during the monsoon, the outflowing water transforms into a waterfall, which is a spectacular sight to behold. Overall, the Chikhloli Dam is a brief yet delicious treat for nature enthusiasts.

 

Dams in Thane district
Dams completed in 1978
1978 establishments in Maharashtra
20th-century architecture in India